A commode chair, known in British English simply as a commode is a type of chair used by someone who needs help going to the toilet due to illness, injury or disability. A commode chair sometimes has wheels to allow easy transport to the bathroom or shower. Most commode chairs have a removable pail and flip-back armrests. 

Historically, similar pieces of equipment were the close stool and the chamber pot. The commode chair evolved from these in the 18th century and became also known as chamber chair, necessary chair.

References

Sources 
 

Toilets
Chairs